Cuba competed at the 1956 Summer Olympics in Melbourne, Australia.

Athletics 

Men's 110m hurdles
Evaristo Iglesias
 Heat — 14.3s
 Semifinals — 14.6s (→ did not advance)

Rowing

Cuba had nine male rowers participate in two out of seven rowing events in 1956.

 Men's coxless four
 Luis Olivera
 Orlando Lanza
 Enrique Hernández
 Joaquín Pérez

 Men's coxed four
 José Roa
 Enrique Torres
 José Romero Santos
 José Hurdado
 Virgilio Ara (cox)

References
Official Olympic Reports
sports-reference

Specific

Nations at the 1956 Summer Olympics
1956
1956 in Cuban sport